Lahore remains a major tourist destination in Pakistan. The Walled City of Lahore was renovated in 2014 and is popular due to the presence of two recognized UNESCO World Heritage Sites. 

Among the most popular sights are the Lahore Fort, adjacent to the Walled City, and home to the Sheesh Mahal, the Alamgiri Gate, the Naulakha pavilion, and the Moti Masjid. The fort along with the Shalimar Gardens has been a UNESCO World Heritage Site since 1981.

The city is home to several ancient religious sites including prominent Hindu temples, the Krishna Temple and Valmiki Mandir. The Samadhi of Ranjit Singh, also located near the Walled City, houses the funerary urns of the Sikh ruler Maharaja Ranjit Singh. The most prominent religious building is the Badshahi Mosque, constructed in 1673; it was the largest mosque in the world upon construction. Another popular sight is the Wazir Khan Mosque, known for its extensive faience tile work and constructed in 1635.

Old city of Lahore is known for the grandeur of its Mughal architecture and is unique in ancient wooden balconies, temples, gurdwaras, havelis, narrow winding streets and busy bazaars.

Burials

Mausolea and shrines

Buildings speak for themselves because architecture is a visual art:

Tomb of Data Ali Hajvri
Tomb of Hazrat Mian Mir
Tomb of Ghazi Ilm-ud-din Shaheed
Tomb Of Ganj e Inayat Sarkar
Tomb of Madho Lal Hussain
Bibi Pak Daman
Tomb of Asif Khan
Tomb of Jahangir
Tomb of Muhammad Iqbal
Tomb of Nur Jahan
Tomb of Qutubuddin Aibak
Tomb of Malik Ayaz
Ahmed Ali Lahori
Samadhi of Ranjit Singh

Cemeteries

Gora Qabristan
Miani Sahib Graveyard

Religious Places

Mosques

Badshahi Mosque
Wazir Khan Mosque
Darbar Ganj e Inayat Sarkar
Suneri Mosque
Moti Masjid (Lahore)
Grand Jamia Mosque

Temples

Krishna Temple
Lava Temple

Churches

 St. Anthony's Church, The Mall
 St. Joseph's Church 
 St. Mary's Church
 Cathedral Church of Resurrection
 St. Andrew's Church
 St. Anthony's Church, The Mall
 St. Joseph's Church 
 St. Mary's Church

Gurdwaras

Gurdwara Dera Sahib

Galleries and museums
Fakir Khana Art Gallery
Lahore Museum
Lahore Art Council (also called Alhamra Arts Council)

Havelis 
There are many havelis inside the Walled City of Lahore, some in good condition while others need urgent attention. Many of these havelis are fine examples of Mughal and Sikh Architecture. Some of the havelis inside the Walled City include:
 Mubarak Begum Haveli, Bhati Gate, Lahore
 Chuna Mandi Havelis
 Haveli of Nau Nihal Singh
 Nisar Haveli
 Haveli Barood Khana
 Salman Sirhindi ki Haveli
 Dina Nath Ki Haveli
 Mubarak Haveli – Chowk Nawab Sahib, Mochi Gate/Akbari Gate
 Lal Haveli beside Mochi Bagh
 Mughal Haveli (residence of Maharaja Ranjeet Singh)
 Haveli Sir Wajid Ali Shah (near Nisar Haveli)
 Haveli Mian Khan (Rang Mahal)
 Haveli Shergharian (near Lal Khou)

Hospitals

 Jinnah Hospital
 Mayo Hospital
 Shaikh Zayed Hospital
 Shaukat Khanum Memorial Hospital
 Sir Ganga Ram Hospital
 Lady Willingdon Hospital

Libraries

Model Town Library
Dyal Singh Trust Library
The Ewing Memorial Library
Punjab Public Library
Quaid-e-Azam Library

Markets
 Liberty Market
 Ali Da Malang (Lahore) or Naveed Nagar
Fortress Stadium (Lahore)
 Abid Market
Moon Market, Lahore
 Kareem Market
 Barkat Market garden Town Lahore
 Anarkali bazaar

Bazars
Old Lahore is a hub of commercial activity:

Anarkali Bazaar
Gawalmandi
M. M. Alam road
Pak Tea House
The Mall
 Ramghar Bazar
Shalimar Bazar
Baghbanpura Bazar
Dharampura Bazar Lahore
 Sadar Bazar, Lahore
Ichhra Bazar
Main Bazar Chungi Ammar Sidhu
Qanchi Bazar Qanchi

Trade centers
Ali Trade Center
Mall Of Defence
 Hafeez Trade Center
Lahore Stock Exchange
 Siddique Trade Center
Hall Road
Vogue Towers
 Haji Plaza

Monuments
Aiwan-e-Iqbal
Akbari Sarai
Bab-e-Pakistan
Bibi Pak Daman
Chauburji
Data Durbar Complex
Lahore Fort
Minar-e-Pakistan
Samadhi of Ranjit Singh
Sheesh Mahal
 Aiwan-e-Quaid-e-Azam at Nazaria-i-Pakistan Trust

Sports venues

See also
List of places in Faisalabad
List of places in Multan

References

External links
 List of tourist place in Lahore at 

Lahore-related lists
Lists of places in Pakistan
World Heritage Sites in Pakistan
Mughal architecture
Mughal gardens in Pakistan
Tourist attractions in Lahore